Acacia unifissilis is a shrub of the genus Acacia and the subgenus Phyllodineae. It is native to an area in the  Wheatbelt region of Western Australia.

Ecology
It blooms from July to September and produces yellow flowers.

See also
 List of Acacia species

References

unifissilis
Acacias of Western Australia
Plants described in 1978